19 Squadron or 19th Squadron may refer to:
No. 19 Squadron RAF, a unit of the Royal Air Force
No. 19 Squadron RAAF, a current unit of the Royal Australian Air Force
No. 19 (Netherlands East Indies) Squadron RAAF, a unit of the Royal Australian Air Force and the Royal Netherlands East Indies Army Air Force in the 1940s
No. 19 Squadron SAAF, a unit of the South African Air Force
19th Fighter Squadron (United States), a unit of the United States Air Force
19th Special Operations Squadron (United States), a unit of the United States Air Force
19th Airlift Squadron (United States), a unit of the United States Air Force
19th Air Refueling Squadron, an inactive unit of the United States Air Force

See also
 19th Corps (disambiguation)
 19th Division (disambiguation)
 19th Brigade (disambiguation)
 19th Regiment (disambiguation)
 19th Group (disambiguation)
 19th Battalion (disambiguation)